Cochin is a resort village in the Canadian province of Saskatchewan within Census Division No. 17. It is on the shores of Jackfish Lake in the Rural Municipality of Meota No. 468.

History 
French traders referred to the immediate area of Cochin as les Détroits before the village was created.

Cochin was founded by father Louis Cochin, originally as a Christian mission. Louis Cochin was himself a french-born Oblate Order missionary. Cochin was incorporated as a resort village on January 1, 1988.

Demographics 

Government 
The Resort Village of Cochin is governed by an elected municipal council and an appointed administrator that meets on the first Tuesday of every month. The mayor is Harvey Walker and its administrator is Amber Loeppky.

Transportation 
The Cochin Bridge provides pedestrian access into the resort village.

See also 
List of communities in Saskatchewan
List of municipalities in Saskatchewan
List of resort villages in Saskatchewan
List of villages in Saskatchewan
List of summer villages in Alberta

References

External links 

Resort villages in Saskatchewan
Meota No. 468, Saskatchewan
Division No. 17, Saskatchewan